Harry Schwartz may refer to:

 Harry Schwartz (U.S. senator) (1869–1955), U.S. Senator from Wyoming
 Harry Schwartz (American football) (1906–1970), college football player
 Harry Schwartz (journalist) (1919–2004), former editorial writer of The New York Times